Our Lady of Health Catholic Church in Coral Springs, Florida is a parish of the St. Thomas Syro-Malabar Catholic Diocese of Chicago.

History
The church was started as a mission in 1986, and was raised to the status of a parish in 2003. Fr. Zacharias Thottuvelil and Fr. John Melepuram served as priests at OLH.
In 2009, more than 400 families belonged to the parish. 

The parish sponsored a national convention for Syro-Malabar Catholics in 2007.

References

External links
 Official website
 Archdiocese of Miami

Asian-American culture in Florida
Indian-American culture
Syro-Malabar Catholic church buildings
Eastern Catholic churches in Florida
Roman Catholic churches in Florida
Churches in Miami-Dade County, Florida
Buildings and structures in Coral Springs, Florida
1986 establishments in Florida
Indian-American culture in Florida
Buildings and structures in Miami-Dade County, Florida